The 10th (City of Belfast) Battalion, Ulster Defence Regiment was formed in 1972 from elements of the 7th Battalion, Ulster Defence Regiment creating a second battalion in Belfast.  It was again amalgamated with 7 UDR in 1984 to form the 7th/10th Battalion, Ulster Defence Regiment.

Uniform, armament & equipment
 See: Ulster Defence Regiment Uniform, armament & equipment

Greenfinches

Notable personnel
 :Category:Ulster Defence Regiment soldiers
 :Category:Ulster Defence Regiment officers

Gerry Adams wounded
When Gerry Adams (the Sinn Féin president) was wounded in an assassination attempt by three members of the UFF it was an off duty full-time Non-commissioned officer of 10 UDR who gave chase to their car and arrested them, assisted by an off duty policeman. This is not noted in Adams' Sinn Féin biography and the BBC still insists the assailants were arrested by "plain clothes policemen". The UDR NCO received the Queen's Gallantry Medal for arresting the gunmen. In the long term however the soldier was intimidated out of his home and the UDR as a direct result of these arrests.

Investigations
A 1977 Army investigation involving D Company, 10 UDR, based at Girdwood Barracks in Belfast revealed that about 70 of the company's soldiers were suspected of links to the UVF, but evidence was only found against two, who were dismissed on security grounds.  30 soldiers from D Company were suspected of fraudulently diverting £47,000 to the UVF; and that UVF members socialized at Girdwood Barracks junior ranks mess. This investigation was halted after a senior UDR officer claimed it was harming morale.

See also
Ulster Defence Regiment
List of battalions and locations of the Ulster Defence Regiment

Bibliography

 A Testimony to Courage – the Regimental History of the Ulster Defence Regiment 1969 – 1992, John Potter, Pen & Sword Books Ltd, 2001, 
 The Ulster Defence Regiment: An Instrument of Peace?, Chris Ryder 1991 
  Lost Lives, David McKittrick, Mainstream, 2004,

References

Military history of County Antrim
Military history of County Down
Military units and formations established in 1972
Military units and formations disestablished in 1992
Battalions of the Ulster Defence Regiment
1972 establishments in the United Kingdom
1984 disestablishments in the United Kingdom